National Anthems Of The World is the first studio album by American jazz musician Stan Kenton and his orchestra under the Creative World label, released late 1972. Recording sessions for the album took place at Western Recorders, 
August 25, 28, 29, 30 & 31, 1972 in Hollywood, California.

Background
When the Kenton band was summoned to the studio in late August 1972, Kenton was emphatic about recording a double album: National Anthems of the World.  He had been convinced to complete this project by his perception of the previous success of Bob Curnow's arrangement of God Save the Queen played on two tours of the United Kingdom in late 1963 and an altered version earlier in 1972.  Curnow had worked on the charts in batches during the Spring of 1972 and delivered them while the band was out on the road. The band would hopefully have a good look the manuscripts by the time they would get in the studio in August.

Many agree that so much talent, enthusiasm and money would have been better spent on more promising jazz material than national anthems.  Much like the Kenton/Wagner recording project of 1964, Kenton hoped the unique and striking 1972 project would accrue prestige and international recognition. The album was even sent to embassies all over the world.   While there were many favorable replies, some were quite surprisingly negative to the extent the government of China bitterly resented their anthem featured on the same LP as arch-enemy Taiwan. Kenton himself would later lament, "The National Anthems album Bob wrote was great, though commercially it died---it was a terrible failure."

Reception

Track listing

All selections arranged and orchestrated by Robert Curnow

Personnel

Musicians
 Alto Saxophone and flute – Quin Davis
 Tenor Saxophone and flute – Chris Galuman, Richard Torres
 Baritone Saxophone and flute – Chuck Carter (2), Willie Maiden
 Trumpet – Dennis Noday, Jay Saunders, Mike Snustead, Mike Vax, Ray Brown
 Trombone – Dick Shearer, Fred Carter, Harvey Coonin, Mike Wallace, Phil Herring
 Afro-Latin percussion – Ramon Lopez
 Piano – Stan Kenton
 Bass – John Worster
 Drums – Peter Erskine

Production
 Producer – Bob Curnow
 Arranged By – Robert Curnow
 Artwork – Young And Dodge
 Engineer and Mixed – Don Sears
 Photography By – Harold Plant

References

Bibliography

External links
 National Anthems Of The World at Allmusic

1972 albums
Instrumental albums
Stan Kenton albums
GNP Crescendo Records albums